The 2011–12 season was Hartlepool United's 103rd year in existence and their fifth consecutive season in League One. Along with competing in League One, the club also participated in the FA Cup, League Cup and League Trophy. The season covers the period from 1 July 2011 to 30 June 2012.

Players

Current squad

Transfers

Transfers in

Transfers out

Loans in

Loans out

Results

Pre-season friendlies

League One

League table

Results summary

Results by matchday

FA Cup

League Cup

Football League Trophy

Squad statistics

Appearances and goals

|}

Goalscorers

Clean Sheets

Penalties

Suspensions

Awards

References 

2011-12
2011–12 Football League One by team
2010s in County Durham